Frankenstein: The Monster Returns is a Nintendo Entertainment System action video game developed by Tose and published by Bandai in 1991 exclusively in North America.

Plot

Set some time after the Frankenstein story, the titular Monster returns from the dead, leading a supernatural army - by way of magic. He razes several villages and kidnaps a beautiful maiden named Emily, with the intent on making her his bride. The Monster even manages to use his magic to subdue several mythical entities such as Death and Medusa as well. The player is a young swordsman of the village determined to stop the supernatural army, rescue Emily, and slay the Monster once and for all.

Gameplay

The game is a side-scrolling platformer with beat 'em up elements. The game also shares a few similarities to other NES platformers, such as the Castlevania franchise. The player starts bare-handed but can eventually find weapons such as clubs or swords and may even find powerup magic that allows them to shoot fireballs. The player can also perform a jumpkick, although it possesses very little offensive power.

References

External links

1991 video games
Action video games
Bandai games
Nintendo Entertainment System games
Nintendo Entertainment System-only games
North America-exclusive video games
Platform games
Tose (company) games
Video games based on Frankenstein
Video games developed in Japan
Single-player video games